Grant Page (born 1939) is an Australian stuntman who worked mostly during the seventies and eighties. Page was the stunt coordinator for the popular Australian action movies The Man from Hong Kong (1975) and Mad Max (1979), as well as other Australian and overseas films including the cult horror flick Death Ship (1980). He starred in the 1970s Australian TV series Danger Freaks, which, while ostensibly a documentary of his professional work with various stunt performers, emphasized the spectacular visual results from these collaborations.  Grant featured in a cameo appearance in the Blur music video M.O.R.

One of the things Grant Page is best remembered for is a failed stunt attempt on The Don Lane Show during 1977 in which he attempted to jump over a moving car. He eventually tried the stunt again, this time successfully, on the same show in 1983.

Page played the killer in Roadgames (1981), which is the favorite Australian film of Quentin Tarantino.

Page starred, along with the band Sorcery, in the 1978 movie Stunt Rock, which combined a fictional plotline about a female journalist who is intrigued by stuntman Page with stunts by Page and musical performances by Sorcery, a hard rock band who incorporated magic into their act.

Further reading

External links 
 
Interview with George Negus

Australian stunt performers
1939 births
Living people